The 2019–20 season was the 63rd season of Unione Calcio Sampdoria in the Serie A, and their 8th consecutive season in the top-flight. The club competed in Serie A and the Coppa Italia.

Former Sassuolo and Roma coach Eusebio Di Francesco replaced Marco Giampaolo as head coach on 22 June 2019, with Giampaolo moving to Milan on 19 June.

Players

Squad information

Appearances include league matches only

Transfers

In

Loans in

Out

Loans out

Pre-season and friendlies

Competitions

Serie A

League table

Results summary

Results by round

Matches

Coppa Italia

Statistics

Appearances and goals

|-
! colspan=14 style=background:#dcdcdc; text-align:center| Goalkeepers

|-
! colspan=14 style=background:#dcdcdc; text-align:center| Defenders

|-
! colspan=14 style=background:#dcdcdc; text-align:center| Midfielders

|-
! colspan=14 style=background:#dcdcdc; text-align:center| Forwards

|-
! colspan=14 style=background:#dcdcdc; text-align:center| Players transferred out during the season

Goalscorers

Last updated: 8 February 2020

Clean sheets

Last updated: 8 February 2020

Disciplinary record

Last updated: 8 February 2020

References

U.C. Sampdoria seasons
Sampdoria